Australian Holographics was a laboratory based in Adelaide, South Australia established in 1989 with the specific objective to produce high quality large format holograms. After two years of research and development the company began commercial operations in 1991. The laboratory eventually shut down in 1998.

The main laser was a CW (continuous wave), 6W argon laser built by Coherent Scientific. The company also used a 3 joule ruby pulse laser, built in collaboration with Professor Jesper Munch of the School of Chemistry and Physics at Adelaide University.

The company mainly specialized in the production of the large format white-light-viewable rainbow hologram, a type of holography originally invented in 1968 by Dr. Stephen Benton of MIT. In fact, while all rainbow holograms are white-light-viewable the most commonly known application of the technique has been applied to reflective substrates like PVC (polyvinyl chloride) and PET (polyethylene terephthalate) and used widely on credit cards and as anti-counterfeiting applications on labeling of products. Australian Holographics applied the principle for transmission rather than reflective viewing conditions. In 1992, Australian Holographics produced a 2×1 metre rainbow transmission hologram of a Mitsubishi station wagon car, which was shown at Holographics International '92 conference in London.

Australian Holographics was particularly notable for the fact that it had signed the first ever commercial joint venture that the South Australian Museum of Natural History had ever entered into, giving the company access to the museum's collection of exhibits.

Creating a large format studio 

The AH project necessitated building a large climate controlled studio incorporating a 6×5 metre optical table weighing around 25 tons. The system had to allow for both the creation of large-depth scenes for mastering, in addition to affording the space required for the effective production of ultra-large format rainbow transmission and reflection hologram copies. A heavy sand-filled cavity steel construction was used for the table. The suspension system was constructed around nine Firestone air bags connected to a standard pneumatic set-up with needle-valves, ballast tank and compressor. Overhead towers were designed to carry large transfer mirrors at heights of over three meters above the table. These towers were constructed from hollow steel tubes filled with sand. Over the years, lifting systems for the large glass film holders evolved from hand operated, to mechanical and finally to pneumatic. Using this platform, it is possible to hold flat a 2×1 meter piece of film and maintain its stability, and that of the related optics, beneath the 5,000th of a millimeter tolerance for the 4–8 second exposure.

Imaging techniques in large format continuous wave holography 

The requirement for stability in the CW (continuous wave) mastering process, has a surprisingly beneficial aspect, in that it allows for the utilization of unstable curtained areas to effectively render invisible unwanted elements in the field of vision. This trick is still unique to CW and is sorely missed during pulse holography mastering, where the problem is that often too many things are visible and there are limited methods available to conceal them. Thus if a large object is required to apparently float unsupported in space, CW mastering, rather than pulsed, provides the means to easily achieve this illusion. Many important elements involved in producing high quality large format holograms rest not so much with the traditional concerns of holography but rather with aesthetic concerns that relate to table layout, and lighting techniques that endeavor to feature the subject without visual distractions and to control glare and reflections that lead to non-linear noise.

The specifications of the vertical film alignment in the holographic camera

During the holographic mastering process for large format rainbow transmission holograms the strip of holographic film that becomes the H1 hologram master must be positioned in front of the subject (3D model) in such a way that it is bathed in diffused laser light, but importantly, must be held rigidly and firmly flat against a sheet of glass. Typically, elaborate hydraulic or vacuum systems have been employed to compress holographic film during the exposure process. However this function was achieved at Australian Holographics by the construction of what was referred to as 'the camera'. In fact the camera was a very long and narrow glass box, approximately 2.2 meters long, about 12 cm high and about 6 cm deep. Inside this 'camera' was a loose piece of glass slightly shorter than the length of the camera, but around the same height.

The surprising utility of: Johnson's Baby Oil 

The long strip of holographic film was placed between the loose glass sheet and the front of the camera, and the entire camera box was then almost filled with Johnson's Baby Oil. This unusual element to the high tech array of equipment and processes came about after the exhaustive testing of the refractive index of countless varieties of commercially available oils, and to the surprise of the holographers concerned, none could surpass the efficacy of this product. The function of the oil inside the camera was to act as an agent to cause the camera to flatten the film between the two glass surfaces. As the oil slowly seeped out between the film's surface and the two glass sheets the natural viscosity of the oil maintained an ultra-thin but cohesive layer that had the effect of gradually pulling the two glass sheets together with a level of force sufficient to flatten the film to within the tolerance level that allowed a consistent interference pattern to be recorded on the H1 master.

History 

Australian Holographics Pty Ltd. was incorporated in Adelaide, South Australia in 1989 by Dr. David Brotherton Ratcliffe. At the time, Dr. Ratcliffe was a Research Fellow in Physics in the School of Physical Sciences, at Flinders University. The senior holographers working with Dr. Ratcliffe were initially  Geoffrey Fox, and subsequently Mark Trinne.

In 1992, Ratcliffe formed GEOLA Labs in Vilnius, Lithuania to concentrate  on the manufacture of pulsed Neodymium YLF lasers. In May 1992, Simon Edhouse joined Australian Holographics as Marketing Manager, and became the General Manager later that year. Then the company focused on international science museums. It sold large holograms to museums in Hong Kong, Singapore, Taipei and Japan. In 1993, Sunkung Corporation of South Korea commissioned Australian Holographics to produce an exhibition of ten large format holograms for Expo '93.

In October 1993, Ratcliffe relocated to Europe, and handed operational control of the day-to-day running of the Adelaide studios to Simon Edhouse and his company Multi Cellular Media Pty. Ltd. Simon Edhouse, as Managing Director of Australian Holographics, managed the marketing and overall operations until the Australian facility closed in 1998.

In 1994, Australian Holographics produced a series of holographic billboards for the Singaporean military to promote the 'NS Men' (National Service Men) campaign, unveiled by the Singapore Minister for Defence  The holograms were rainbow transmissions, and enclosed in a compact viewing enclosure which housed a mirror to extend the light path for optimal viewing conditions. Also in 1994, Multi Cellular Media Pty. Ltd. trading as Australian Holographics, signed a joint venture agreement with the South Australian Museum, giving the company access to the Museum's vast collection of exhibits.

A holographic diorama of extinct thylacines

One of the first projects undertaken by the new venture was the production of a 1.6×1.1 metre rainbow transmission hologram of a family of thylacines. The holographic thylacines, shown standing on a rocky outcrop in a field of dry grass, portrays the now extinct thylacines as a family group, with the small thylacine pup protruding 50 cm in front of the holographic image-plane. The finished hologram had its debut at the SA Museum as part of the Inaugural Innovate SA festival in September 1995.

The company also produced a 1.5×1.1 metre hologram of a Tyrannosaurus rex skull from the S.A. Museum's collection.

In 1995, a large series of holograms were produced of satellites and space vehicles. The most notable of these holograms was the giant 2.1×1.1 metre rainbow transmission hologram of the MIR Space Station. This hologram showed a 2 x 3 metre scale model of MIR apparently floating high above the Earth. The model of the Earth used in this hologram was custom made by Adelaide artist John Haratsis. It measured 4×5×.6 metres resembling a thin slice of a much larger sphere.

In 1996, a great white shark hologram was produced by the company from a 4.5-metre model made in Queensland by David Joffe. The resulting 1.5 x 1.1 metre rainbow transmission hologram would become the most popular of all the Australian Holographics stock images, being sold around the world to museums, private collections and tourist venues.

Artists working with Australian Holographics 

In 1992 Professor Ju Yong Lee,  a lecturer at the Korea National University of Arts, was given a grant by the company to undertake a period as artist in residence. In 1993 he commissioned Australian Holographics to produce a series of 10 large format holograms, designed by Professor Lee, that were displayed at the Korean Expo in Seoul.

In 1995 holographic artist Paula Dawson was also awarded an artist in residence grant by the company to produce a 30×40 cm reflection hologram for the Shrine of the Sacred Heart for St. Brigid's Church in Sydney. The hologram depicted an elaborate four metre spherical geodesic dome made from reinforced plaster and constructed in the lab, which also contained hundreds of freshly picked frangipani flowers flown from Sydney on the day of the shoot in dozens of egg cartons. The hologram was partly funded by the Catholic Church and also by an Australian Artist Creative Fellowship from the Australia Council.

External links 
Australian Holographics

References

Companies based in Adelaide
Defunct companies of Australia
Holography industry